Little Norton
is an area of Norton Canes, Cannock Chase, Staffordshire. The area is located near Brownhills West and is also next to Chasewater Railway. The area is a residential area of Norton Canes. It is located next to the Norton Services. And the M6 Toll Motorway. Bus no.3 runs through the area between Norton Canes and Brownhills West.

References

Cannock Chase District